Rashard Quovon Lewis (born August 8, 1979) is an American former professional basketball player. Lewis entered the NBA directly from Alief Elsik High School. He rose to prominence in the NBA as a scorer with the Seattle SuperSonics, and was later a member of the Orlando Magic, Washington Wizards and Miami Heat. He garnered two NBA All-Star selections, one with Seattle and another with Orlando. Lewis reached the NBA Finals three times, winning an NBA championship in 2013 as a member of the Heat.

NBA career

Seattle SuperSonics (1998–2007)
Despite being recruited by Florida State, Kansas and Houston, Lewis bypassed college and opted for the 1998 NBA draft, wherein he was selected by the Seattle SuperSonics with the 32nd overall pick. At the time of his selection, he was the last player remaining in the "green room", where fifteen of the top draft prospects sit until their selection. He and teammate Ray Allen made Seattle a contender during the early 2000s.

In 2001, Lewis was selected to play for the United States Basketball Team in the Goodwill Games, in which they won the gold medal. On October 31, 2003, Lewis scored a career-high 50 points to lead the Seattle SuperSonics to a 124–105 win over the Los Angeles Clippers to close out a two-game series in Saitama, Japan. Lewis was named an All-Star in 2004–05. Lewis holds the SuperSonics' record for most three-pointers made, having passed Dale Ellis for second place on November 22, 2005, and Gary Payton for first place on March 13, 2007, when Lewis made his 918th three-pointer in a game against the Detroit Pistons.

Orlando Magic (2007–2010)
After playing his first nine seasons for the Seattle SuperSonics, Lewis joined the Orlando Magic in July 2007, as he agreed to a six-year sign-and-trade deal worth $118 million. In his first season with the Magic, Lewis was moved from his usual small forward position to power forward. That year, he made 53 more three-pointers than his previous single-season record (173, 2004–05). During the playoffs, the Magic reached the second round, with Lewis contributing a 33-point performance against the Detroit Pistons in Orlando's only win of the series. Lewis was the Magic's top scorer in the playoffs and set personal records in points, rebounds, and assists.

Lewis started the 2008–09 season as the team's second leading scorer, earning an appearance in the 2009 NBA All-Star Game. In the 2009 NBA playoffs, Lewis hit a game-winning shot in the first game of the Eastern Conference Finals against the Cleveland Cavaliers, what he called the biggest shot of his career. The Magic won the series and advanced to the NBA Finals, where they were defeated by the Los Angeles Lakers in five games.

On August 6, 2009, Lewis was suspended without pay for the first ten games of the 2009–10 season after testing positive for a banned substance that he had taken during the 2008–09 NBA season. He was tested for it during the 2009 NBA Finals. The over-the-counter supplement he was taking contained Dehydroepiandrosterone which is frequently used to combat fatigue.

Washington Wizards (2010–2012)
On December 18, 2010, Lewis was traded to the Washington Wizards in exchange for Gilbert Arenas. In 60 games for the Wizards over two seasons, Lewis averaged 9.7 points, 4.9 rebounds and 1.5 assists per game.

New Orleans Hornets (2012)
On June 20, 2012, Lewis was traded, along with the 46th pick in the 2012 NBA draft, to the New Orleans Hornets in exchange for Trevor Ariza and Emeka Okafor. On June 30, 2012, the Hornets agreed to buyout terms with Lewis and waived him.

Miami Heat (2012–2014)
On July 11, 2012, Lewis signed a two-year deal with the Miami Heat. The move reunited him with former Seattle teammate Ray Allen. The Heat finished the 2012–13 season with a league-best 66–16 record. Lewis won his first NBA championship with the Heat's Finals series victory over the San Antonio Spurs.

Lewis earned rave reviews from Heat coach Erik Spoelstra for the way he defended in Game 3 of the 2014 Eastern Conference Finals against the Indiana Pacers, even though he finished without a single point, rebound, assist or steal. Lewis worked his way into the starting lineup during the series, earning notoriety for helping the team despite a lack of impressive box score statistics in games 3 and 4. In Game 5 of the series, Lewis started again, and scored 18 points on 6-of-9 shooting from behind the three-point line. In Game 6, Lewis started and scored 13 points as the Heat advanced to the NBA Finals. The Heat went on to lose the Finals to the San Antonio Spurs in five games.

Dallas Mavericks (2014) 
On July 19, 2014, Lewis signed with the Dallas Mavericks. However, just four days later, his contract was voided by the Mavericks after he failed his physical when it was discovered that his right knee required surgery.

BIG3 career

3 Headed Monsters (2017–present) 
In 2017, Rashard joined the 3 Headed Monsters of the BIG3 basketball league, a team that included NBA Hall of Famer Gary Payton as the head coach, and teammates such as Jason Williams, Mahmoud Abdul-Rauf and Kwame Brown. The 3 Headed Monsters went 7-1, reaching the Championship game, where they lost to undefeated Trilogy. Lewis was awarded MVP for the season.

NBA career statistics

Regular season

|-o
| align="left" | 
| align="left" | Seattle
| 20 || 7 || 7.3 || .365 || .167 || .571 || 1.3 || .2 || .4 || .1 || 2.4
|-
| align="left" | 
| align="left" | Seattle
| 82 || 8 || 19.2 || .486 || .333 || .683 || 4.1 || .9 || .8 || .4 || 8.2
|-
| align="left" | 
| align="left" | Seattle
| 78 || 78 || 34.9 || .480 || .432 || .826 || 6.9 || 1.6 || 1.2 || .6 || 14.8
|-
| align="left" | 
| align="left" | Seattle
| 71 || 70 || 36.4 || .468 || .389 || .810 || 7.0 || 1.7 || 1.5 || .6 || 16.8
|-
| align="left" | 
| align="left" | Seattle
| 77 || 77 || 39.5 || .452 || .346 || .820 || 6.5 || 1.7 || 1.3 || .5 || 18.1
|-
| align="left" | 
| align="left" | Seattle
| 80 || 80 || 36.6 || .435 || .376 || .763 || 6.5 || 2.2 || 1.2 || .7 || 17.8
|-
| align="left" | 
| align="left" | Seattle
| 71 || 71 || 38.0 || .462 || .400 || .777 || 5.5 || 1.3 || 1.1 || .9 || 20.5
|-
| align="left" | 
| align="left" | Seattle
| 78 || 77 || 36.9 || .467 || .384 || .818 || 5.0 || 2.3 || 1.3 || .6 || 20.1
|-
| align="left" | 
| align="left" | Seattle
| 60 || 60 || 39.1 || .461 || .390 || .841 || 6.6 || 2.4 || 1.1 || .7 || 22.4
|-
| align="left" | 
| align="left" | Orlando
| 81 || 81 || 38.0 || .455 || .409 || .838 || 5.4 || 2.4 || 1.2 || .5 || 18.2
|-
| align="left" | 
| align="left" | Orlando
| 79 || 79 || 36.2 || .439 || .397 || .836 || 5.7 || 2.6 || 1.0 || .6 || 17.7
|-
| align="left" | 
| align="left" | Orlando
| 72 || 72 || 32.9 || .435 || .397 || .806 || 4.4 || 1.5 || 1.1 || .4 || 14.1
|-
| align="left" | 
| align="left" | Orlando
| 25 || 25 || 32.4 || .419 || .367 || .756 || 4.2 || 1.2 || .9 || .4 || 12.2
|-
| align="left" | 
| align="left" | Washington
| 32 || 27 || 31.7 || .446 || .347 || .843 || 5.8 || 2.0 || .9 || .6 || 11.4
|-
| align="left" | 
| align="left" | Washington
| 28 || 15 || 26.0 || .385 || .239 || .838 || 3.9 || 1.0 || .8 || .4 || 7.8
|-
|style="text-align:left;background:#afe6ba;"| †
| align="left" | Miami
| 55 || 9 || 14.4 || .414 || .389 || .622 || 2.2 || .5 || .4 || .3 || 5.2
|-
| align="left" | 
| align="left" | Miami
| 60 || 6 || 16.2 || .415 || .343 || .788 || 1.8 || 1.0 || .9 || .1 || 4.5
|- class="sortbottom"
| style="text-align:center;" colspan="2"| Career 
| 1,049 || 842 || 32 || .452 || .386 || .805 || 5.2 || 1.7 || 1.1 || .5 || 14.9
|- class="sortbottom"
| style="text-align:center;" colspan="2"| All-Star
| 2 || 0 || 17.5 || .308 || .167 || .500 || 5.0 || .5 || .5 || .0 || 5.0

Playoffs

|-
| align="left" | 2000
| align="left" | Seattle
| 5 || 5 || 31.4 || .441 || .474 || .800 || 6.2 || .6 || 1.0 || .6 || 15.4
|-
| align="left" | 2002
| align="left" | Seattle
| 3 || 2 || 26.3 || .375 || .167 || 1.000 || 3.7 || .7 || .3 || .0 || 12.7
|-
| align="left" | 2005
| align="left" | Seattle
| 8 || 8 || 39.0 || .406 || .200 || .880 || 5.4 || 1.6 || .4 || .4 || 16.9
|-
| align="left" | 2008
| align="left" | Orlando
| 10 || 10 || 41.7 || .436 || .309 || .821 || 7.2 || 3.4 || 1.1 || .5 || 19.5
|-
| align="left" | 2009
| align="left" | Orlando
| 24 || 24 || 41.1 || .448 || .394 || .784 || 6.4 || 2.9 || 1.0 || .5 || 19.0
|-
| align="left" | 2010
| align="left" | Orlando
| 14 || 14 || 36.6 || .462 || .373 || .800 || 5.6 || 2.3 || 1.1 || .7 || 12.9
|-
|style="text-align:left;background:#afe6ba;"| 2013†
| align="left" | Miami
| 11 || 0 || 4.3 || .400 || .000 || .500 || .6 || .4 || .2 || .2 || 1.5
|-
| align="left" | 2014
| align="left" | Miami
| 18 || 8 || 17.7 || .412 || .373 || .750 || 2.1 || .3 || .4 || .3 || 5.3
|- class="sortbottom"
| style="text-align:center;" colspan="2"| Career
| 93 || 71 || 30.4 || .436 || .356 || .818 || 4.7 || 1.8 || .7 || .5 || 12.8

See also

 List of National Basketball Association career 3-point scoring leaders

References

External links

Rashard Lewis at nba.com

1979 births
Living people
African-American basketball players
American men's basketball players
American sportspeople in doping cases
Basketball players from Louisiana
Basketball players from Houston
Big3 players
Doping cases in basketball
Goodwill Games medalists in basketball
McDonald's High School All-Americans
Miami Heat players
National Basketball Association All-Stars
National Basketball Association high school draftees
Orlando Magic players
Parade High School All-Americans (boys' basketball)
People from Pineville, Louisiana
Power forwards (basketball)
Seattle SuperSonics draft picks
Seattle SuperSonics players
Small forwards
Sportspeople from Winter Park, Florida
Washington Wizards players
Competitors at the 2001 Goodwill Games
21st-century African-American sportspeople
20th-century African-American sportspeople
American men's 3x3 basketball players
Sportspeople from Rapides Parish, Louisiana